"How Long (Betcha' Got a Chick on the Side)" is a song by American vocal group the Pointer Sisters, released as the first single from their Steppin' album in 1975. Written by group members Anita Pointer and Bonnie Pointer with David Rubinson, the song's mixture of funky R&B and the sisters' soulful harmonies helped make it a standout in the Pointer Sisters' early catalog. The single was a significant success for the group, reaching number 20 on the US Billboard Hot 100 chart and was the group's first and only number-one single on the US Hot Soul Singles chart, where it spent two weeks at number one.

Personnel
Anita Pointer – lead vocals, backing vocals
Ruth Pointer – backing vocals
Bonnie Pointer – backing vocals
June Pointer – backing vocals
David Rubinson – producer

References

1975 songs
1975 singles
The Pointer Sisters songs
Songs written by Anita Pointer
Songs written by Bonnie Pointer
Blue Thumb Records singles
Funk songs